Buyo is a town in south-western Ivory Coast. It is a sub-prefecture of and the seat of Buyo Department in Nawa Region, Bas-Sassandra District. Buyo is also a commune. The city sits on the south shore of Lake Buyo.

The far southern portion of the sub-prefecture is located in Taï National Park.

In 2021, the population of the sub-prefecture of Buyo was 100,848.

Villages
The villages of the sub-prefecture of Buyo and their population in 2014 are:

References

Sub-prefectures of Nawa Region
Communes of Nawa Region